Tengku Hazman bin Raja Hassan (born 6 March 1977) is a Malaysian former professional footballer.

Club career
He last played as a midfielder with PKNS FC, which he joined from his previous club Terengganu FA for the 2011 season.

National team
Hazman represented Malaysia 16 times from 1998 to 2005, scoring 3 goals. He also has captained the national team. Early in his career, he was in the Malaysia national under-21 football team that competes in the 1997 FIFA World Youth Championship, held in Malaysia.

Coaching career
After his playing career ended, Hazman turned to coaching and has coached youth teams of Kelantan and T-Team. He acted as assistant coach to Mustafa Kamal during Terengganu II's 2018 Malaysia Premier League season, and subsequently took over as acting head coach in August 2018 after Mustafa was sacked due to his failure to avoid Terengganu II's relegation to Malaysia FAM League. In this capacity, Hazman succeeded in leading the club to win the inaugural Malaysia Challenge Cup, beating UKM F.C., 4–2, on aggregate in the final.

International Senior Goals

Honours

Selangor 
 Malaysia FA Cup: 2001

Perlis 
 Malaysia Cup: 2004

PKNS FC 
 Malaysia Premier League: 2011

Personal life
HIs younger brother Tengku Hasbullah is also a professional football player, formerly playing for Kelantan FA.

External links

References

1977 births
Living people
Malaysian people of Malay descent
Malaysian footballers
Malaysia international footballers
PKNS F.C. players
Selangor FA players
Sri Pahang FC players
Perlis FA players
Terengganu FC players
People from Kota Bharu
People from Kelantan

Association football midfielders